The Bihar women's football team is the women's football team for the Indian state of Bihar.

Their U-17 junior team were the runners-up of the National Junior (U-17) Girls’ Football tournament 2022–23 held at Guwahati.

Honours
 Junior Girl's National Football Championship
 Runners-up (1): 2022–23

See also
 India women's football championship
 Bihar men's football team

References

Football in Bihar
Women's football teams in India
Year of establishment missing